Gümüşköy (literally "silver village") is a Turkish place name that may refer to the following places in Turkey:

 Gümüşköy, Germencik, a village in the district of Germencik, Aydın Province
 Gümüşköy Geothermal Power Plant, in the village
 Gümüşköy mine, near the village

See also
 Gümüş (disambiguation), "silver"